Muhammad Arshad Khan Leghari (born 1 January 1960) is a Pakistani politician who served as Minister of State for Industries and Production, in Abbasi cabinet from August 2017 to May 2018. He had been a member of the National Assembly of Pakistan, from 2008 to May 2018.

Early life
He was born on 1 January 1960.

Political career

He ran for the seat of the Provincial Assembly of Punjab as a candidate of Pakistan Muslim League (Q) (PML-Q) from Constituency PP-297 (Rahim Yar Khan-XIII) in 2002 Pakistani general election. He received 21,863 votes and lost the seat to Aziz Aslam Shaikh.

He was elected to the National Assembly of Pakistan as a candidate of Pakistan Muslim League (N) (PML-N) from Constituency NA-197 (Rahim Yar Khan-VI) in 2008 Pakistani general election. He received 82,565 votes and defeated Rais Munir Ahmad, a candidate of PML-Q. In the same election, he ran for the seat of the Provincial Assembly of Punjab as a candidate of Sindh United Party from Constituency PP-295 (Rahim Yar Khan-XI) but was unsuccessful. He received 89 votes and lost the seat to Makhdoom Ahmed Mehmood. In the same election, he also ran for the seat of the Provincial Assembly of Punjab as an independent candidate from Constituency PP-297 (Rahim Yar Khan-XIII) but was unsuccessful. He received 425 votes and lost the seat to Rais Ibraheem Khalil Ahmad, a candidate of Pakistan Peoples Party (PPP).

He was re-elected to the National Assembly as a candidate of PML-N from Constituency NA-197 (Rahim Yar Khan-VI) in 2013 Pakistani general election. He received 80,944 votes and defeated Makhdoom Syed Murtaza Mehmood.

Following the election of Shahid Khaqan Abbasi as Prime Minister of Pakistan in August 2017, he was inducted into the federal cabinet of Abbasi. He was appointed  the Minister of State for Industries and Production. Upon the dissolution of the National Assembly on the expiration of its term on 31 May 2018, Leghari ceased to hold the office as Minister of State for Industries and Production.

References

Living people
Pakistan Muslim League (N) MNAs
British people of Baloch descent
Pakistani MNAs 2013–2018
1960 births
Pakistani MNAs 2008–2013
Pakistani emigrants to the United Kingdom
Naturalised citizens of the United Kingdom